The Mahajana Socialist Party is a political party in Telangana and Andhra Pradesh, India. The party was founded by Manda Krishna Madiga on 4 January 2014, who became its president. The flag of the party displays a rising sun on blue background.

The party fielded three candidates in the 2014 Lok Sabha election, standing in Eluru, Peddapalli and Rajampet.

References

Political parties established in 2014
Political parties in Telangana
Political parties in Andhra Pradesh
2014 establishments in Telangana
Socialist parties in India
2014 establishments in Andhra Pradesh